James Frederick Hanley (February 17, 1892 – February 8, 1942) was an American songwriter and author.

Biography
Hanley was born in Rensselaer, Indiana on February 17, 1892. He attended Champion College and the Chicago Musical College.

He served with the United States Army 82nd Division in World War I and during his military service he wrote an army musical show called Toot Sweet.

On his discharge Hanley became a vaudeville accompanist. He went on to write songs for film and theater including many Broadway productions. He worked with numerous artists, most notably Buddy DeSylva, Edward Madden, Eddie Dowling, Percy Wenrich, Theodore F. Morse and Ballard MacDonald.

Hanley is best remembered for the hit songs "(Back Home Again in) Indiana" (1917), "Second Hand Rose" (1921) and "Zing! Went the Strings of My Heart" (1934). For the latter song, Hanley contributed both music and lyrics but for most of his songs he wrote the music alone.

He died of a heart attack at his home in Douglaston, Queens, on February 8, 1942, leaving a widow and five children. Hanley was inducted into the Songwriters Hall of Fame in 1970.

Musical theatre credits
 Toot Sweet

Broadway
 Robinson Crusoe, Jr. (1916), co-composer with Sigmund Romberg
 Ziegfeld Follies of 1917 (1917), featured songwriter
 The Greenwich Village Follies of 1920 (1920), featured songwriter
 Jim Jam Jems (1920), composer, lyrics by Harry Cort and George Stoddard
 Ziegfeld Follies of 1921 (1921), featured songwriter
 Pins and Needles of 1922 (1922), co-composer with Frederick Chappelle, lyrics by Ballard MacDonald and Irving Caesar
 Spice of 1922 (1922), co-composer with J. Fred Coots and Henry Creamer, lyrics by James Stanley and McElbert Moore
 Big Boy (1925), co-composer with Joseph Meyer, lyrics by Buddy DeSylva
 No Foolin'  (1926), featured songwriter, lyrics by Gene Buck
 Honeymoon Lane (1926), composer, lyrics by Eddie Dowling
 Sidewalks of New York (1927), co-composer, co-author with Eddie Dowling
 Keep It Clean (1929), co-composer
 Ziegfeld Follies of 1934 (1934), featured songwriter
 Thumbs Up! (1934), co-composer with Henry Sullivan

Also contributed songs to:
 Ziegfeld Follies of 1922 (1922)
 George White's Scandals of 1923 (1923)
 Innocent Eyes (1924)
 Gay Paree of 1925 (1925)
 High Queen (1926)
 Take the Air (1927)

Selected songs
 "A Cabaret 'Neath the Old Egyptian Moon"
 "(Back Home Again in) Indiana"
 "Breeze (Blow My Baby Back to Me)"
 "Dig a Little Deeper"
 "Dreaming of Home Sweet Home" – 1918. L: Ballard MacDonald
 "Dreams for Sale"
 "Gee, but I Hate to Go Home Alone"
 "Good-Bye, My Little Lady" – 1917. L: Joe Goodwin
 "Half a Moon"
 "I'm a Lonesome Little Raindrop (Looking for a Place to Fall)" – 1920
 "I Wonder What He's Doing To-Night" – 1917. L: Joe Goodwin
 "I've Got a Ten Day Pass for a Honeymoon (With the Girl I Left Behind)" – 1918. L: Walter Donaldson and Ballard MacDonald
 "Jersey Walk"
 "Just a Cottage Small by a Waterfall"
 "Last Long Flight" – 1920
 "Little Bit of Sunshine (From Home)" – 1918. L: Ballard MacDonald and Joe Goodwin
 "Little Log Cabin of Dreams"
 "The Little White House (At the End of Honeymoon Lane)"
 "Mary Dear"
 "No Foolin
 "Never Forget to Write Home" – 1917. L: Ballard MacDonald
 "Ragtime Volunteers Are Off to War" – 1917. L: Ballard MacDonald
 "Rose of Washington Square"
 "Second Hand Rose" – 1921, made popular by Fanny Brice and later associated with Barbra Streisand
 "Sleepy Valley"
 "Three Wonderful Letters from Home" – 1918. L: Ballard MacDonald and Joe Goodwin
 "War Babies" – 1916. L: Ballard MacDonald and Edward Madden
 "We'll Be There, on the Land, on the Sea, in the Air" – 1917. L: Ballard MacDonald
 "Wherever You Are"
 "Zing! Went the Strings of My Heart" – 1934, made popular by Judy Garland; reprised throughout her career.

Selected filmography
 So This Is London (1930)
 Under Suspicion (1930)

References

External links
 
 James F. Hanley recordings at the Discography of American Historical Recordings

1892 births
1942 deaths
20th-century American male musicians
20th-century American male writers
American male songwriters
People from Rensselaer, Indiana
Songwriters from Indiana
United States Army personnel of World War I